This is a list of cricketers who have played matches for the Sargodha cricket team.

 Shaukat Abbas
 Faisal Afridi
 Sajjad Akbar
 Saleem Akhtar
Rizwan Aslam
 Dildar Awan
 Aziz-ur-Rehman
 Syed Iftikhar Bokhari
 Iqbal Chaudhri
 Humayun Farkhan
 Mohammad Hafeez
 Ahmed Hayat
 Zahid Hussain
 Mujahid Jamshed
 Naeem Khan
 Samiullah Khan
 Sherandaz Khan
 Zaheer Khan
 Naved Latif
 Saleem Malik
 Abdul Mannan
 Afzal Masood
 Misbah-ul-Haq
 Mohammad Nawaz
 Arshad Pervez
 Wasim Raja
 Ahsan Raza
 Akram Raza
 Farrukh Raza
 Anis-ur-Rehman
 Ali Sawal
 Aamer Sohail
 Azhar Sultan

References 

Lists of Pakistani cricketers